Transmetropolitan is the debut album by German metal band War from a Harlots Mouth. It was released in Germany on September 18, 2007 and released worldwide on November 21, 2008 through Lifeforce Records. It is the last release with vocalist Steffan Winopal.

Track listing

Personnel
Daniel Oberländer - guitars
Simon Hawemann - guitars
Filip Hantusch - bass
Paule Seidel - drums
Steffen Winopal - vocals

References

War from a Harlots Mouth albums
2007 debut albums
Lifeforce Records albums